The Archdeacon of Worcester is a senior clergy position in the Diocese of Worcester in the Church of England. Among the archdeacon's responsibilities is the care of clergy and church buildings within the area of the Archdeaconry of Worcester.

History
The first recorded archdeacons in the Diocese of Worcester occur from  around the same time that archdeacons occur across the church in England. Two archdeacons are recorded simultaneously from that time, but no clear territorial title occurs until 1143, when Gervase is called Archdeacon of Gloucester.

The Archdeaconry of Birmingham was created from Worcester and Coventry archdeaconries by Order-in-Council on 12 August 1892 but became part of the new Diocese of Birmingham upon its creation by Order-in-Council on 13 January 1905.

The archdeaconry is currently subdivided into six deaneries: Evesham, Malvern, Martley and Worcester West, Pershore, Upton, and Worcester East. The current Archdeacon of Worcester is the Venerable Robert Jones.

Deaneries, rural deans and lay chairs as of 2019

List of archdeacons

High Medieval
Senior archdeacon of the diocese:
bef. 1086–bef. 1114 (d.): Ailric
bef. 1114–21 March 1125 (d.): Hugh (probably previously junior archdeacon)
Archdeacons of Worcester:
1125–1143 (deprived): William Cumin (also Bishop-elect of Durham, 1141; deprived)
1144–bef. 1157 (res.): Godfrey
bef. 1157–bef. 1159 (d.): William Cumin (restored)
bef. 1159–bef. 1168 (d.): Godfrey (restored)
bef. 1168–bef. 1190 (d.): Simon Luvel
bef. 1190–bef. 1198 (d.): Peter de Leche
bef. 1198–aft. 1196: John of Cornwall
bef. 1200–aft. 1217: John Brancastre
December 1218–bef. 1243: William Scot (also Bishop-elect of Durham, 1226–1227)
June 1243–aft. 1256: Vincent of Abergavenny
bef. 1257–aft. 1270: Robert de Esthall
bef. 1275–27 July 1287 (d.): Hugh of Evesham
16 October 1287 – 4 July 1288 (deprived): Ralph de Hingham
4 July 1288–aft. 1311: Francesco Napoleone Cardinal Orsini (also cardinal-deacon of Santa Lucia in Orthea from 1295)

Late Medieval
1312–1317 (d.): Henri de la Tour du Pin (later Bishop of Metz)
aft. 1317–1320 (d.): John de Brucy
15 May 1321–bef. 1329 (d.): Adam le Chaumpeneys de Sandwico
17 October 1329 – 7 April 1337 (exch.): John de Orleton
7 April 1337–bef. 1349: Robert de Worcester
16 May 1349 – 18 February 1353 (exch.): John de Severle
18 February 1353 – 1366 (res.): John Harewell (became Bishop of Bath and Wells)
1366–4 May 1371 (exch.): Simon Clement
4 May 1371–bef. 1383 (d.): John Blanchard
4 December 1383 – 1389 (res.): William Malpas (royal candidate)
2 May 1388–bef. 1412: William Rocombe (papal candidate)
28 October 1412–bef. 1432 (res.): John Ixworth
31 May 1431–bef. 1433 (res.): John Burdett
5 May 1433 – 13 November 1438 (exch.): William Hende
13 November 1438–bef. 1452 (res.): John Verney (probably Dean of Lichfield, 1432–1447)
19 October 1452–bef. 1467 (res.): William Vaunce
12 November 1467–bef. 1472 (res.): Thomas Hawkins (previously Archdeacon of Stafford)
4 May–May 1472 (res.): Robert Inkbarrow

19 May 1472–bef. 1476 (d.): Thomas Hawkins (again)
26 July–bef. November 1479: John Burton
24 November 1479 – 1483 (res.): Richard Burton
4 August 1483–aft. 1518: Thomas Alcock
bef. 1529–1531 (res.): Stephen Gardiner (became Bishop of Winchester)
4 April 1531–bef. 1534 (d.): William Claybrook 
12 May 1534 – 1563 (d.): Peter Vannes (also Dean of Salisbury from 1536)

Early modern
1563–bef. 1579 (res.): Thomas Powell
15 July 1579 – 1598 (res.): Godfrey Goldsborough (became Bishop of Gloucester)
1598–bef. 1610 (res.): John Johnson
1610–4 August 1623 (d.): William Swaddon
1623–bef. 1629 (d.): Hugh Lloyd
3 August 1629–bef. 1645 (d.): Edward Thornborough
30 May 1645–bef. 1676 (d.): William Hodges
4 September 1676–bef. 1705 (d.): John Fleetwood
14 December 1705 – 7 August 1742 (d.): William Worth
10 September 1742 – 21 November 1774 (d.): John Tottie
1775–8 March 1787 (d.): John Warren
21 March 1787 – 12 August 1815 (d.): Thomas Evans
29 August 1815 – 18 October 1849 (d.): Richard Onslow
9 November 1849 – 5 May 1881 (d.): Richard Hone

Late modern
May 1881 – 1889 (d.): William Lea, sometime Vicar of St Peter's Droitwich
1889–1911 (ret.): William Walters, Vicar of Pershore until 1894, then Rector of Alvechurch until 1904, then Vicar of Malvern Wells from 1905
1911–1921 (res.): John Greig, Rector of Hartlebury (became Bishop of Gibraltar)
1921–1938 (ret.): James Peile, Rector of Alvechurch until 1925, then of Ripple until 1926
193826 September 1944 (d.): Ridley Duppuy (Canon, Assistant Bishop of Worcester from 1936, and Vice-Dean from 1940; former Bishop of Victoria)
1944–1961 (ret.): Thomas Wilson, Rector of Hartlebury until 1956
1961–1975 (ret.): Peter Eliot, Vicar of Cropthorne with Charlton until 1965 (afterwards archdeacon emeritus)
1975–1980 (ret.): John Williams (afterwards archdeacon emeritus)
1981–1984 (res.): Peter Coleman (became Bishop suffragan of Crediton)
1984–1999 (ret.): Frank Bentley (afterwards archdeacon emeritus)
1999–2008 (res.): Joy Tetley
5 October 2008 – 25 July 2014 (res.): Roger Morris (became area Bishop of Colchester)
16 November 2014–present: Robert Jones

References

Sources

External links 
Worcester Diocesan website
Church of England Statistics 2002

Lists of Anglicans
 
Lists of English people
Archdeacons
Anglican Diocese of Worcester
Christianity in Worcester, England
Christianity in Worcestershire